Clyde C. Miller Career Academy is a public high school located in St. Louis, Missouri in the Grand Central Arts District of Midtown

Overview
97% of Clyde C Miller's student body is African-American. The student to teacher ratio is 14:1. 100% of the student body is eligible for Free Lunch 
An attempted senior prank in 2018 on Clyde C Miller by fellow seniors involving throwing eggs and water balloons resulted in the police being called and several students getting pepper sprayed, with 1 arrest.

References

High schools in St. Louis
Public high schools in Missouri
Buildings and structures in St. Louis